Lümatu may refer to several places in Estonia:

Lümatu, Ida-Viru County, village in Maidla Parish, Ida-Viru County
Lümatu, Võru County, village in Urvaste Parish, Võru County